Isoko South is a local government area (LGA) in the Isoko region of Delta State, Nigeria. With its headquarters at Oleh, Nigeria, it is one of the two local governments that make up the Isoko region. The other is Isoko North, which has its headquarters at Ozoro.

History
The Isoko people migrated historically from the Benin Kingdom in nearby Edo State, and therefore share some cultural similarities with this state. 
The area later formed part of Bendel State, before Bendel State was split to form Edo and Delta states.

The Isoko South and North Local Government Area was established on 23 September 1991, when the former Isoko Local Government Area was subdivided. The area produces a large component of the oil and gas resources of Delta State.

Geography
The Isoko South Local Government Area covers a low-lying section of the larger Niger Delta Basin, interspersed with streams, canals and rivers. It is located in a region of deciduous and evergreen forests, with patches of mangrove forest, as well as a forest reserve along the Aviara clan area.

Demographics
The local population are primarily of the Isoko people. There are eleven communities in Isoko South, and each of them are subdivided into several clans. 
Communities inhabiting Isoko South include the Aviara, Olomoro, Emede, Enhwe, Erowha, Igbide, Irri, Okpolo, Oleh, Delta, Umeh and Uzere. The Isoko language is predominant in much of the area.

The traditional occupation of the people of Isoko South is fishing and agriculture.

Current population centres include Oleh town - the seat of the Isoko South government - as well as the Olomoro urban community.

Names of monarchs and their titles in Isoko South 
The different communities in Isoko South Local Government Area are being governed by a monarch constituted by the Delta State government. Their names and titles are as follow:

 H.R.M. Ewhiri II, The Ovie of Emede KingdomMonarch governing Emede Community.
 H.R.M. Udogri I (JP), The Ovie of Uzere Kingdom.Monarch governing Uzere Kingdom.
 H.R.M. Obukeni I (JP), The Ovie of Igbide Kingdom,Monarch governing Igbide Community.
 H.R.M. Ambrose O. Owhe (JP), The Odio-ologbo of Umeh Kingdom.Monarch governing Umeh Community.
 H.R.M. Ovrawah A. Omogha 1 (JP) FCAI, The Odio-ologbo of Community.Monarch governing Oleh Community.
 H.R.M. Samuel Otidi, The Odio-ologbo of Okpolo Kingdom.Monarch governing Okpolo Community. 
 H.R.M. Harry Emaviwe, The Ovie of Aviara Kingdom.Monarch governing Aviara Community. 
 H.R.M. Anthony O. Efekodha (MNSE, FMHR),Ejuzi II, The Ovie of Enwhe Kingdom.Monarch governing Enwhe Community.
 H.R.M. Kenneth Onomeregwae, The Odio-ologbo of Erowha Kingdom.Monarch governing Erowha Community. 
 H.R.M. Josiah Umukoro, Aghaza 1, The Odio-ologbo of Olomoro Kingdom.Monarch governing Olomoro Community.
 H.R.M. Joshua Aghagba, The Odio-ologbo of Irri Kingdom.Monarch governing Irri Community.

Isoko South Local Government List of Divisional Officers, Residents, Sole Administrators and Chairmen
Since the creation of Isoko south local government, it has been governed by different officers ranging from divisional officers to residents, sole administrators and chairmen.

Landmarks and attractions
Of the tourist areas, the Araya Bible Tourist Center, the Eni of Uzere and the sandbeaches of Ivrogbo are popular.

The cultural attractions of the area include a range of traditional festivals, crafts (such as the distinctive pottery made from the local kaolin clays), the traditional clothing and a strong culture of hospitality.

The area's festivals include the Oliho Festival of the Oleh kingdom, the Omode festival of Iri, the Ivri of Olomoro, the Idhu and Abarne of Igbide, the Osia of Umeh, the Ogwa-Enwhe of the Enwhe kingdom, the Oniowise of Emede, the Ovore of Erowha, the Uloho of Orie and the popular Eni of the Uzere Kingdom.

Environmental challenges and projects

Oil and gas exploration activities began in the area in the early 1950s, and the second oil well in Nigeria was discovered in Uzere, Isoko South, in 1958. The massive growth of the oil and gas industries has created significant environmental challenges, and have been a source of much concern for the local government.

Challenges such as gas flaring, oil spills from pipelines, deforestation and waste miss-management have been made more serious by federal laws which centralise control of the oil rich land and allow local government relatively little control over activities. 
Due to such concerns, in 2001, the Isoko South Local Government joined ICLEI - Local Governments for Sustainability, the first local government in Nigeria to do so.

The local government has since engaged in extensive project work to combat the effects of oil and gas pollution. It has promulgated a law that makes Environmental Impact Assessments (EIA) compulsory for all developmental and industrial projects, and has also carried out environmental auditing with environmental regulators and NGOs in the local government area.
Large tree planting projects have also been launched in collaboration with community-based organisations and with UNDP GEF/SGP support.

Notable people
Lieutenant General Alexander Odeareduo Ogomudia(rtd)CFR DSS fwc psc(+) MSc FNSE, is a retired Nigerian army officer who served as Chief of Defence Staff and Chief of Army Staff
High Chief Dr. Stephen Onovughakpor Akpotu (JP), former President-General and Grand Patron of the Isoko Development Union (IDU), Chairman, Movement for the Creation of Delta State
Kenneth Ogba, politician
Christian Aggrey Owoma Apena, Archbishop and Evangelist.
John Aruakpor, Bishop of Anglican communion (Oleh, Delta  Diocese).
Major General Paul Ufuoma Omu(rtd), sole administrator and former military governor of the South-Eastern State
Fred Amata, Nigerian actor, producer and director
John Odafe Asiemo (alias Daddy Showkey), Nigerian galala singer
Bovi Ugboma,Nigerian Comedian

See also
 Oleh, Delta
 Isoko region

References 

Local Government Areas in Delta State